J.E. Roush Fish and Wildlife Area is an area dedicated to providing hunting and fishing opportunities while maintaining ,  of which are water of J.E. Roush Lake. It is located along U.S. Route 224 east of Huntington, Indiana.  Water levels of the flood control reservoir are maintained by the U.S. Army Corps of Engineers.

Hunting
Hunting opportunities include hungitn for deer, small game, waterfowl, and turkey.

Facilities
Wildlife Viewing
Ice Fishing
Hunting
Trapping
Shooting Range
Archery Range
Dog Training Area
Boat Ramp (Motors permitted)
Dump Station
Camping
25 full hook-up
20 primitive sites

References

Parks in Indiana
Protected areas of Huntington County, Indiana
Protected areas of Wells County, Indiana